Elections to Bournemouth Borough Council were held on 5 May 2011, in line with other local elections in the United Kingdom. All 54 seats, across 18 wards of this unitary authority, were up for election.

There were 176 candidates nominated, comprised as follows: 54 Conservatives, 40 Labour, 39 Liberal Democrats, 24 Independents, 14 UK Independence Party, 4 Green Party and 1 Liberal Party.  There were 3 more candidates standing than in the 2007 election.

Composition of council seats before election

Election result summary

|}

Less than a week after the elections, Derek Borthwick, elected as an independent in the Throop and Muscliff ward joined the Conservative Party.

Election results by ward

References

2011 English local elections
2011
2010s in Dorset